Union Township may refer to:

Arkansas
 Union Township, Ashley County, Arkansas
 Union Township, Baxter County, Arkansas
 Union Township, Conway County, Arkansas
 Union Township, Faulkner County, Arkansas
 Union Township, Fulton County, Arkansas
 Union Township, Greene County, Arkansas
 Union Township, Independence County, Arkansas
 Union Township, Izard County, Arkansas
 Union Township, Jackson County, Arkansas
 Union Township, Lee County, Arkansas
 Union Township, Marion County, Arkansas
 Union Township, Nevada County, Arkansas
 Union Township, Ouachita County, Arkansas
 Union Township, Perry County, Arkansas
 Union Township, Prairie County, Arkansas
 Union Township, Randolph County, Arkansas
 Union Township, Saline County, Arkansas
 Union Township, Stone County, Arkansas
 Union Township, Van Buren County, Arkansas
 Union Township, White County, Arkansas

Illinois
 Union Township, Cumberland County, Illinois
 Union Township, Effingham County, Illinois
 Union Township, Fulton County, Illinois
 Union Township, Livingston County, Illinois

Indiana
 Union Township, Adams County, Indiana
 Union Township, Benton County, Indiana
 Union Township, Boone County, Indiana
 Union Township, Clark County, Indiana
 Union Township, Clinton County, Indiana
 Union Township, Crawford County, Indiana
 Union Township, DeKalb County, Indiana
 Union Township, Delaware County, Indiana
 Union Township, Elkhart County, Indiana
 Union Township, Fulton County, Indiana
 Union Township, Gibson County, Indiana
 Union Township, Hendricks County, Indiana
 Union Township, Howard County, Indiana
 Union Township, Huntington County, Indiana
 Union Township, Jasper County, Indiana
 Union Township, Johnson County, Indiana
 Union Township, LaPorte County, Indiana
 Union Township, Madison County, Indiana
 Union Township, Marshall County, Indiana
 Union Township, Miami County, Indiana
 Union Township, Montgomery County, Indiana
 Union Township, Ohio County, Indiana
 Union Township, Parke County, Indiana
 Union Township, Perry County, Indiana
 Union Township, Porter County, Indiana
 Union Township, Randolph County, Indiana
 Union Township, Rush County, Indiana
 Union Township, St. Joseph County, Indiana
 Union Township, Shelby County, Indiana
 Union Township, Tippecanoe County, Indiana
 Union Township, Union County, Indiana
 Union Township, Vanderburgh County, Indiana
 Union Township, Wells County, Indiana
 Union Township, White County, Indiana
 Union Township, Whitley County, Indiana

Iowa
Union Township, Adair County, Iowa
Union Township, Adams County, Iowa
Union Township, Appanoose County, Iowa
Union Township, Benton County, Iowa
Union Township, Black Hawk County, Iowa
Union Township, Boone County, Iowa
Union Township, Calhoun County, Iowa
Union Township, Carroll County, Iowa
Union Township, Cass County, Iowa
Union Township, Cerro Gordo County, Iowa
Union Township, Crawford County, Iowa
Union Township, Dallas County, Iowa
Union Township, Davis County, Iowa
Union Township, Delaware County, Iowa
Union Township, Des Moines County, Iowa
Union Township, Fayette County, Iowa
Union Township, Floyd County, Iowa
Union Township, Guthrie County, Iowa
Union Township, Hardin County, Iowa
Union Township, Harrison County, Iowa
Union Township, Jackson County, Iowa
Union Township, Johnson County, Iowa
Union Township, Kossuth County, Iowa
Union Township, Louisa County, Iowa
Union Township, Lucas County, Iowa
Union Township, Madison County, Iowa
Union Township, Mahaska County, Iowa
Union Township, Marion County, Iowa, in Marion County, Iowa
Union Township, Mitchell County, Iowa
Union Township, Monroe County, Iowa
Union Township, O'Brien County, Iowa
Union Township, Plymouth County, Iowa
Union Township, Polk County, Iowa
Union Township, Poweshiek County, Iowa
Union Township, Ringgold County, Iowa
Union Township, Shelby County, Iowa, in Shelby County, Iowa
Union Township, Story County, Iowa
Union Township, Union County, Iowa, in Union County, Iowa
Union Township, Van Buren County, Iowa
Union Township, Warren County, Iowa, in Warren County, Iowa
Union Township, Wayne County, Iowa, in Wayne County, Iowa
Union Township, Woodbury County, Iowa
Union Township, Worth County, Iowa

Kansas
 Union Township, Barton County, Kansas
 Union Township, Butler County, Kansas
 Union Township, Clay County, Kansas
 Union Township, Dickinson County, Kansas
 Union Township, Doniphan County, Kansas
 Union Township, Jefferson County, Kansas
 Union Township, Kingman County, Kansas
 Union Township, McPherson County, Kansas
 Union Township, Pottawatomie County, Kansas, in Pottawatomie County, Kansas
 Union Township, Rawlins County, Kansas, in Rawlins County, Kansas
 Union Township, Republic County, Kansas
 Union Township, Rice County, Kansas
 Union Township, Rush County, Kansas, in Rush County, Kansas
 Union Township, Sedgwick County, Kansas
 Union Township, Sheridan County, Kansas
 Union Township, Sherman County, Kansas
 Union Township, Stafford County, Kansas, in Stafford County, Kansas
 Union Township, Washington County, Kansas, in Washington County, Kansas

Michigan
 Union Charter Township, Michigan
 Union Township, Branch County, Michigan
 Union Township, Grand Traverse County, Michigan

Minnesota
 Union Township, Houston County, Minnesota

Missouri

 Union Township, Barton County, Missouri
 Union Township, Benton County, Missouri
 Union Township, Bollinger County, Missouri
 Union Township, Cass County, Missouri
 Union Township, Clark County, Missouri
 Union Township, Crawford County, Missouri
 Union Township, Daviess County, Missouri
 Union Township, Dunklin County, Missouri
 Union Township, Franklin County, Missouri
 Union Township, Harrison County, Missouri
 Union Township, Holt County, Missouri
 Union Township, Iron County, Missouri
 Union Township, Jasper County, Missouri
 Union Township, Laclede County, Missouri
 Union Township, Lewis County, Missouri
 Union Township, Lincoln County, Missouri
 Union Township, Marion County, Missouri
 Union Township, Monroe County, Missouri
 Union Township, Nodaway County, Missouri
 Union Township, Perry County, Missouri
 Union Township, Polk County, Missouri
 Union Township, Pulaski County, Missouri
 Union Township, Putnam County, Missouri
 Union Township, Randolph County, Missouri
 Union Township, Ripley County, Missouri
 Union Township, Ste. Genevieve County, Missouri
 Union Township, Scotland County, Missouri
 Union Township, Stone County, Missouri
 Union Township, Sullivan County, Missouri
 Union Township, Washington County, Missouri
 Union Township, Worth County, Missouri
 Union Township, Webster County, Missouri
 Union Township, Wright County, Missouri

Nebraska
 Union Township, Butler County, Nebraska
 Union Township, Dodge County, Nebraska
 Union Township, Knox County, Nebraska
 Union Township, Phelps County, Nebraska
 Union Township, Saunders County, Nebraska

New Jersey
 Union Township, Camden County, New Jersey
 Union Township, Hunterdon County, New Jersey
 Union Township, Union County, New Jersey

North Carolina
 Union Township, Pender County, North Carolina
 Union Township, Randolph County, North Carolina
 Union Township, Robeson County, North Carolina
 Union Township, Rutherford County, North Carolina
 Union Township, Wilkes County, North Carolina

North Dakota
 Union Township, Grand Forks County, North Dakota

Ohio
 Union Township, Auglaize County, Ohio
 Union Township, Belmont County, Ohio
 Union Township, Brown County, Ohio
 Union Township, Carroll County, Ohio
 Union Township, Champaign County, Ohio
 Union Township, Clermont County, Ohio
 Union Township, Clinton County, Ohio
 Union Township, Fayette County, Ohio
 Union Township, Hancock County, Ohio
 Union Township, Highland County, Ohio
 Union Township, Knox County, Ohio
 Union Township, Lawrence County, Ohio
 Union Township, Licking County, Ohio
 Union Township, Logan County, Ohio
 Union Township, Madison County, Ohio
 Union Township, Mercer County, Ohio
 Union Township, Miami County, Ohio
 Union Township, Morgan County, Ohio
 Union Township, Muskingum County, Ohio
 Union Township, Pike County, Ohio
 Union Township, Putnam County, Ohio
 Union Township, Ross County, Ohio
 Union Township, Scioto County, Ohio
 Union Township, Tuscarawas County, Ohio
 Union Township, Union County, Ohio
 Union Township, Van Wert County, Ohio
 Union Township, Warren County, Ohio
West Chester Township, Butler County, Ohio, formerly known as Union Township

Oklahoma
Union Township, Canadian County, Oklahoma
Union Township, Garfield County, Oklahoma
Union Township, Grady County, Oklahoma
Union Township, Kingfisher County, Oklahoma
Union Township, Lincoln County, Oklahoma
Union Township, Payne County, Oklahoma
Union Township, Washita County, Oklahoma
Union Township, Woodward County, Oklahoma

Pennsylvania
 Union Township, Adams County, Pennsylvania
 Union Township, Berks County, Pennsylvania
 Union Township, Erie County, Pennsylvania
 Union Township, Centre County, Pennsylvania
 Union Township, Clearfield County, Pennsylvania
 Union Township, Crawford County, Pennsylvania
 Union Township, Fulton County, Pennsylvania
 Union Township, Huntingdon County, Pennsylvania
 Union Township, Jefferson County, Pennsylvania
 Union Township, Lawrence County, Pennsylvania
 Union Township, Lebanon County, Pennsylvania
 Union Township, Luzerne County, Pennsylvania
 Union Township, Mifflin County, Pennsylvania
 Union Township, Schuylkill County, Pennsylvania
 Union Township, Snyder County, Pennsylvania
 Union Township, Tioga County, Pennsylvania
 Union Township, Union County, Pennsylvania
 Union Township, Washington County, Pennsylvania

South Dakota
 Union Township, Brule County, South Dakota, in Brule County, South Dakota
 Union Township, Butte County, South Dakota
 Union Township, Davison County, South Dakota, in Davison County, South Dakota
 Union Township, Day County, South Dakota, in Day County, South Dakota
 Union Township, Edmunds County, South Dakota, in Edmunds County, South Dakota
 Union Township, Faulk County, South Dakota, in Faulk County, South Dakota
 Union Township, McCook County, South Dakota, in McCook County, South Dakota
 Union Township, Meade County, South Dakota, in Meade County, South Dakota
 Union Township, Moody County, South Dakota, in Moody County, South Dakota
 Union Township, Sanborn County, South Dakota, in Sanborn County, South Dakota
 Union Township, Spink County, South Dakota, in Spink County, South Dakota

See also
 North Union Township (disambiguation)
 West Union Township (disambiguation)
 Union Grove Township (disambiguation)
 Union (disambiguation)

Township name disambiguation pages